Microsaccus is a genus of flowering plants from the orchid family, Orchidaceae. It is native to Southeast Asia.

Description

Vegetative characteristics
These miniature epiphytes produce laterally flattened, distichously arranged leaves on thin stems.

Generative characteristics
The usually two-flowered inflorescences are short. The spurred, minuscule flowers have a simple labellum. The flowers have four pollinia. Within the fruits there are pale brown to whitish trichomes with an oblong-elliptic basal zone. They have perforations in the basal region.

Etymolgy
The generic name Microsaccus  is composed of the Greek words μικρός (mikrós) meaning small and saccus meaning sack, which refers to the labellum.

Ecology
Microsaccus truncatus is known to grow epiphytically in montane forest at 1200 m above sea level. Microsaccus griffithii  occurs in forests at elevations of 500 - 2770 m above sea level.

Physiology
Microsaccus uses CAM photosynthesis.

Taxonomy

Species
The genus contains 13 accepted species:
Microsaccus affinis J.J.Sm.  - Java
Microsaccus albovirescens J.J.Sm. - Sumatra
Microsaccus ampullaceus J.J.Sm. - Sumatra, Borneo, Malaysia
Microsaccus borneensis J.J.Sm. - Borneo
Microsaccus canaliculatus J.J.Sm. - Sumatra
Microsaccus dempoensis J.J.Sm. - Sumatra
Microsaccus griffithii (C.S.P.Parish & Rchb.f.) Seidenf. - Cambodia, Myanmar, Thailand, Vietnam, Borneo, Malaysia, Java, Sumatra, Philippines 
Microsaccus javensis Blume - Malaysia, Java
Microsaccus mihoae  P.O'Byrne & Gokusing - Borneo
Microsaccus ramosus J.J.Sm. - Java
Microsaccus sumatranus J.J.Sm. - Malaysia, Sumatra
Microsaccus truncatus Carr - Malaysia
Microsaccus wenzelii Ames - Philippines

Phylogeny
It is closely related to the genus Jejewoodia . One species, namely Jejewoodia longicalcarata (Ames & C.Schweinf.) J.J.Wood used to be Microsaccus longicalcaratus Ames & C.Schweinf. It has been suggested to reunite these two genera, due to their similar appearance. Another closely related genus is Adenocos, which does not have a spur, unlike the former two genera.

Horticulture
Microsaccus can be cultivated under moist conditions with a lot of air movement, and intermediate temperatures. The plants should be placed in a semi-shaded position. It is rarely cultivated.

See also
 List of Orchidaceae genera

References

External links

Vandeae genera
Aeridinae
Flora of Vietnam
Flora of Thailand
Flora of Myanmar
Flora of the Philippines
Flora of Cambodia
Flora of Borneo
Orchids of Vietnam
Orchids of Thailand
Orchids of Myanmar
Orchids of the Philippines
Orchids of Cambodia
Orchids of Borneo